Francisco Manuel Lumbrales de Sá Carneiro, GCTE, GCC, GCL (19 July 19344 December 1980) was a Portuguese politician, Prime Minister of Portugal for most of 1980, and founder of the Social Democratic Party. He only held office of Prime Minister for eleven months, dying in a plane crash with his partner, "Snu" Abecassis (born Ebba Merethe Seidenfaden), on 4 December 1980. A parliamentary inquiry said in 2004 that there was evidence of a bomb in the aircraft, after a 1995 inquiry had concluded there was evidence of sabotage.

Background
Sá Carneiro was born in Vitória, Porto, the third of the five children of lawyer José Gualberto Chaves Marques de Sá Carneiro (1897–?) and Maria Francisca Judite Pinto da Costa Leite (1908–?) of the Counts of Lumbrales in Spain.

Career
A lawyer by training, Sá Carneiro became a member of the National Assembly in 1969 and, in turn, one of the leaders of the "Liberal Wing" (Ala Liberal) which attempted to work for the gradual transformation of Marcelo Caetano's dictatorship into a Western European liberal democracy.

In May 1974, a month after the Carnation Revolution, Sá Carneiro founded the Popular Democratic Party (PPD), together with Francisco Pinto Balsemão, Joaquim Magalhães Mota, Carlos Mota Pinto, João Bosco Mota Amaral, Alberto João Jardim, António Barbosa de Melo and António Marques Mendes, and became its secretary-general. The PPD was soon renamed the Social Democratic Party (PSD); despite Sá Carneiro's original claims to be leading a left-of-centre party, he and the party soon drifted to the right, becoming the country's main centre-right force. He was minister without portfolio in a number of provisional governments, and was elected as a deputy to the Constitutional Assembly the next year.

In 1976, he was elected to the Assembly of the Republic. In November 1977, he resigned his office as president of the party, only to be reelected to that office the next year.

In the general election of late 1979, he led the Democratic Alliance, a coalition of his Social Democratic Party, the right-wing Democratic and Social Centre Party, and two smaller parties, to victory. The Alliance polled 45.2 percent of the popular vote and gained 128 of the 250 seats in the Assembly of the Republic; 75 of these were from the PSD.  President António Ramalho Eanes subsequently called on him to form a government on 3 January 1980, and formed Portugal's first majority government since the Carnation Revolution of 1974. In a second general election held in October that year, the Democratic Alliance increased its majority. The Alliance received 47.2 percent of the popular vote and 134 seats, 82 of them from the PSD. Sá Carneiro's triumph appeared to augur well for the presidential election two months later, in which Sá Carneiro was supporting António Soares Carneiro (no relation).

Death

His victory was short-lived, however. On 4 December 1980, while on his way to a presidential election rally in Porto, the Cessna 421 he was on crashed into a building in Camarate, Loures, soon after takeoff from Lisbon Airport. Eyewitnesses claimed they saw pieces falling from the plane just moments after it took off. Rumours have continued to fuel conspiracy theories that the crash was in fact an assassination, but no firm evidence has come to light. There were even different theories as to who might have been the target of such an assassination, as Francisco de Sá Carneiro was travelling with the Defence Minister, Adelino Amaro da Costa, who had said he had documents relating to the October surprise conspiracy theory and was planning on taking them to the United Nations General Assembly.

Dependent to a considerable extent on Sá Carneiro's personal popularity, the Democratic Alliance was unable to maintain its momentum in the wake of his death. Faced with a national crisis, the public rallied behind the incumbent president, António Ramalho Eanes, who easily defeated the Alliance candidate in the presidential election a few days later.

The airport where Sá Carneiro was heading has been named after him as Francisco de Sá Carneiro Airport, despite objections that it would be in bad taste to name an airport after someone who died in a plane crash.

Family

He was married to Isabel Maria Ferreira Nunes de Matos (b. Porto, Miragaia, 1936), and had five children: 
 Francisco Nunes de Matos de Sá Carneiro, unmarried and without issue
 Isabel Maria Nunes de Matos de Sá Carneiro, unmarried and without issue
 Maria Teresa Nunes de Matos de Sá Carneiro, and had two sons:
 Francisco de Sá Carneiro e Nogueira (b. Porto, Santo Ildefonso, 1986)
 Lourenço de Sá Carneiro e Nogueira (b. Porto, Santo Ildefonso, 1988)
 José Nunes de Matos de Sá Carneiro (b. Porto, Cedofeita, 1963), married in Mealhada, Luso, 1991 Isabel Maria Guedes de Macedo Girão (b. Porto, Ramalde, 1965), and had an only daughter:
 Inês de Macedo Girão de Sá Carneiro (b. Porto, Santo Ildefonso, 1992)
 Pedro Nunes de Matos de Sá Carneiro (b. Porto, 1964), married to Maria Benedita de Matos Chaves Pinheiro Torres, of the Barons of a Torre de Pero Palha, b. 1967, and had an only daughter:
 Maria Teresa Pinheiro Torres de Sá Carneiro (b. Porto, 2000)

Later in life he lived together with Snu Abecassis, who died in the same accident as Sá Carneiro.

Ideological assessment and legacy 

Sá Carneiro started his political life in the youth of the Acção Católica (the Portuguese Catholic Action), being his first activity in civic life to write a letter to Marcelo Caetano requesting the return of the António Ferreira Gomes, the exiled pro-democracy bishop of Oporto. He probably had links with the Catholic syndicalist organizations and Christian socialism in general. He was very influenced by Catholic personalism and humanism (especially its Christian version).

Sá Carneiro tried to adapt the social-democratic ideas of the likes of Eduard Bernstein, Karl Kautsky, and the post-1945 SPD to the cultural context of Portugal and its traditionally Catholic society. The Godesberg Program had a very important influence in his social democratic thought as it became the model for his party and its cut with Marxist socialism.

Despite having an anti-collectivist and anti-statist party with an emphasis on personal rights and duties that was responsible for privatizing the industrial sectors nationalized during the revolutionary period, he increased social spending during his term, supported land reform and its redistribution in Alentejo and he was proud that his party had been adopted by the working, middle-class blue-collar worker and middle-low class workers and that his party defended "the construction of a socialist society in liberty". Due to all these specificities, he called his party's ideology "Portuguese Social Democracy".

He was recognized as populist by supporters and opponents, as well as neutral analysts.

Works 
Sá Carneiro was the author of various works, among them:

Uma Tentativa de Participação Política (An Attempt of Political Participation) (1973)
Por uma Social-Democracia Portuguesa (For a Portuguese Social Democracy) (1975)
Poder Civil; Autoridade Democrática e Social-Democracia (Civilian Power; Democratic Authority and Social Democracy (1975)
Uma Constituição para os Anos 80: Contributo para um Projecto de Revisão (A Constitution for the 1980s: Contribution for a Project of Revision) (1979).

Honours
  Grand-Cross of the Order of Christ, Portugal (29 May 1981)
 Grand-Cross of the Order of the Tower and of the Sword, of Valour, Loyalty and Merit, Portugal (7 March 1986)
 Grand Cross of the Order of Liberty, Portugal (29 November 1990)

See also
Liberalism in Portugal

References

External links 

1934 births
1980 deaths
Conspiracy theories in Europe
Recipients of the Order of the Tower and Sword
Grand Crosses of the Order of Christ (Portugal)
Grand Crosses of the Order of Liberty
People from Porto
Political party founders
20th-century Portuguese lawyers
Portuguese Roman Catholics
Portuguese social democrats
Prime Ministers of Portugal
State leaders killed in aviation accidents or incidents
Social Democratic Party (Portugal) politicians
University of Lisbon alumni
Victims of aviation accidents or incidents in 1980
Victims of aviation accidents or incidents in Portugal